Green Building Initiative (GBI) is a 501(c)(3) nonprofit organization that owns and administers the Green Globes green building assessment and certification in the United States and Canada. It was established in 2004 and is headquartered in Portland, Oregon.

The organization works to accelerate the adoption of building practices that result in resource-efficient, healthier and environmentally sustainable buildings. It educates through the Green Globes certification program and Guiding Principles Compliance for federal building sustainability requirements, which provide independent verification for green building and operational practices. GBI focuses on energy conservation, reduced water consumption, responsible use of materials, ecological stewardship and healthy indoor environments for occupants.

History
GBI acquired the U.S. rights to the Green Globes building assessment and certification program in 2004 and adapted it for the U.S. market as an alternative to the commercial building rating system. The Green Globes certification program was launched in the U.S. in 2005 as an online building design management tool for architects and builders of sustainable commercial buildings. Green Globes originated from a system started in 1990 in the United Kingdom called BREEAM (Building Research Establishment Environmental Assessment Method). In an effort to make the tool more user-friendly, the standard was turned into a questionnaire-based rating tool. It was later converted to a web-based format, renamed Green Globes and marketed throughout the U.S. by GBI.

Green Globes eventually came to include modules for New Construction (NC), Existing Buildings (EB), Existing Healthcare Buildings and Sustainable Interiors (SI). GBI offers these programs to builders, designers and building managers.

In 2005, GBI was accredited as a standards developer through the American National Standards Institute (ANSI). It developed the ANSI/GBI 01-2010: Green Building Assessment Protocol for Commercial Buildings to guide the development of Green Globes products. The organization began updating the ANSI Standard in 2016, which was completed in 2018 and titled Green Globes Assessment Protocol for Commercial Buildings.

The nonprofit also provides training and certification for professionals who use their programs.

In 2011, GBI developed the Guiding Principles Compliance (GPC) program to measure compliance with the Federal Guiding Principles for Sustainable Buildings as required by Executive Order 13514 signed in 2009.

In January 2018, GBI acquired the global rights to Green Globes from JLL, which allowed GBI to support existing Green Globes users in Canada in addition to the United States, and to expand the rating system globally.

Certification
Green Globes is a science-based building rating system for building owners and operators to select sustainability features. It uses a third-party certification for building owners to demonstrate sustainable features, operational efficiencies and measures to protect occupant health. Projects that have achieved over 35 percent of the 1,000 available points through third-party verification can earn a rating of 1 to 4 Green Globes.

The Green Globes for New Construction certification includes two stages for assessment and certification. The preliminary assessment occurs after concept design when construction documents are available. The final assessment occurs when construction is complete. Users can evaluate their systems based on the number of applicable points in seven categories.

The evaluation walks through a sequence of criteria questions in an online portal. Once the questionnaire is completed, the user is introduced to their third-party Green Globes Assessor, who is an expertise in green building design, engineering, construction and facility operations. The Green Globes Assessor prepares a report that provides a list of achievements along with recommendations for sustainable building strategies. The Assessor then performs an onsite assessment of the project to verify that the self-reported claims made in the online evaluation and to suggest recommendations for improvement.

Assessment

Green Globes for New Construction
Green Globes for New Construction (Green Globes NC) is a system to evaluate, quantify and improve the sustainability of new building projects. There are 1,000 available points across seven environmental assessment areas.

Green Globes for Existing Buildings
The Green Globes for Existing Buildings program (Green Globes EB) is used by building owners and property managers to evaluate the building's current operating performance, create a baseline for performance, plan for improvements and monitor ongoing performance. There are 1,000 available points across ]six environmental assessment areas.

Green Globes Professional Program
The Green Globes Professional (GGP) program is a network of individuals that guide clients through the Green Globes certification process. All applicants must demonstrate 5+ years of industry experience directly pertaining to commercial buildings. The curriculum covers green building concepts, Green Globes assessment protocols, Green Globes rating and certification and case studies. It is approved by the American Institute of Architects (AIA) for 5 LU/HSW continuing education credits, and is web-based and self-paced.

Guiding Principles Compliance
In 2011, GBI developed the Guiding Principles Compliance Assessment (GPC) program for use by federal agencies in assessing compliance with the Federal Interagency Sustainability Working Group's Guiding Principles for sustainable existing buildings as required by Executive Order 13514. The principles are a set of established criteria that are required to achieve federal sustainability goals. The two major elements of the GPC are a compliance survey and a third-party on-site assessment. 

The GPC survey is broken down into six topic areas:
 Employ Integrated Design Principles
 Optimize Energy Performance 
 Protect and Conserve Water 
 Enhance Indoor Environmental Quality 
 Reduce the Environmental Impact of Materials
 Assess and Consider Climate Change Risks

Agencies may choose to pursue either or both Green Globes certification and Guiding Principles Compliance.

In October 2013, the GSA claimed two tools, LEED and Green Globes, allow federal agencies to measure reduction targets for water, energy and greenhouse gas emissions against industry standards. It recommended that agencies use one of the two certification systems. By October 2016, the GSA's Office of Leasing added the option for Green Globes as green building rating certification systems to the Request for Lease Proposals (RLP) and lease language, citing the program as a nationally recognized green rating assessment, guidance and certification program for new construction projects, existing buildings and interior spaces.

References

Sustainable building in the United States
Real estate-related professional associations
Real estate industry trade groups